Valan is a small coastal village on the island of Magerøya in Nordkapp Municipality in Troms og Finnmark county in far northern Norway. The European route E69 highway runs through the village.

References

Villages in Finnmark
Magerøya
Nordkapp